Robert Burns Pirie (18 April 1905 – 9 January 1990) was a vice admiral in the United States Navy. He was Deputy Chief of Naval Operations for air when he retired in 1962.

Biography

A native of Wymore, Nebraska, he was a 1926 graduate of the United States Naval Academy. He joined the Navy's air arm in 1928. In World War II he was executive officer of the carrier  in the Atlantic.

He was named Deputy Chief of Naval Operations in 1958, serving until his retirement.

In the 1950s, he was allowed to wear facial hair, unusual then, reportedly because of a skin condition. It was a distinguished-looking Van Dyke beard.

While serving as Deputy Chief of Navy Operation (Air) 1958-1962 and was credited with maintaining the Navy’s air traffic controller program, following the enactment of the Federal Aviation Act of 1958. The Air Traffic Controller of the Year award, named in honor of Vice Adm. Robert B. Pirie, is presented for outstanding contributions to operational readiness and safety applied by individual Navy and Marine Corps Air Traffic Controller.

In 1958, Pirie also became an inaugural member, along with Hugh Dryden, Abe Silverstein and Ira Abbott, of the Civilian-Military Liaison Committee, which sought to coordinate the space-related activities of the Department of Defense with those of the newly created NASA. He helped to assemble the original January 1959 list of more than 500 test pilot volunteers which would quickly be whittled down to the April 1959 list of Mercury Seven astronauts.

Pirie retired from active duty in November 1962. After he left the Navy, he held management positions with the Aerojet General Corporation. He was a former president of the Naval Academy Foundation and the National Naval Aviation Museum in Pensacola, Florida.  He was inducted into the Naval Aviation Hall of Honor in 1986.

After Pirie's death in 1990, he was interred at the United States Naval Academy Cemetery.

Awards

Vice Admiral Robert Burns Pirie received a lot of high military decorations for valor or for distinguished service. His military awards included Navy Distinguished Service Medal, Silver Star, Legion of Merit with Gold Star or Bronze Star Medal.
Here is his ribbon bar:

References

1905 births
1990 deaths
People from Gage County, Nebraska
United States Naval Academy alumni
United States Naval Aviators
United States Navy personnel of World War II
United States Navy admirals
Recipients of the Navy Distinguished Service Medal
Recipients of the Silver Star
Recipients of the Legion of Merit
Burials at the United States Naval Academy Cemetery